Caladenia luteola, commonly known as the lemon spider orchid, is a species of orchid endemic to the south-west of Western Australia. It has a single, hairy leaf and up to three lemon-yellow flowers with red stripes on the labellum. It is only known from two small populations near Woodanilling.

Description 
The sepals and petals have long, brown, thread-like tips. The sides of the labellum have irregular serrations and two rows of broad, anvil-shaped, shiny cream-coloured calli in the centre. Flowering occurs from September to mid-October.

Taxonomy and naming 
Caladenia luteola was first described in 2001 by Stephen Hopper and Andrew Phillip Brown from a specimen collected near Woodanilling and the description was published in Nuytsia. The specific epithet (luteola) is a Latin word meaning "yellowish" referring to the colour of the flowers.

Distribution and habitat 
Lemon spider orchid occurs between Woodanilling and Katanning in the Avon Wheatbelt biogeographic region where it grows on low, sandy hills near salt lakes and temporary creeks.

Conservation
Caladenia luteola is classified as "Threatened Flora (Declared Rare Flora — Extant)" by the Western Australian Government Department of Parks and Wildlife meaning that it is likely to become extinct or is rare, or otherwise in need of special protection.

References 

luteola
Orchids of Western Australia
Endemic orchids of Australia
Plants described in 2001
Endemic flora of Western Australia
Taxa named by Stephen Hopper
Taxa named by Andrew Phillip Brown